A cruising yacht is a sailing or motor yacht that is suitable for long-distance travel and offers enough amenities to live aboard the boat, yet is small enough to not require a professional crew. A yacht that would require a professional crew enters the category of superyacht.

Sail 
Sailing cruising yachts are designed for multi-day voyages with the capacity for overnight passage making. Their range and endurance relies primarily on sail power and the storage of provisions for the crew.

Power 
Power cruising yachts are designed for multi-day voyages with the capacity for overnight passage making. Their range and endurance relies primarily on fuel supply and the storage of provisions for the crew.

See also 
 Cruising (maritime)
 Cruising Club of America
 Cruising Yacht Club of Australia

References

External links 
 Cruising Resources - Your Personal Cruising Databank

Yachting